On July 25, 2022, multiple shootings occurred in the City of Langley and Township of Langley in British Columbia, Canada. Two people were killed in the shootings, and two others were injured. The shooter, who was known to police, was later located near the Willowbrook Shopping Centre and killed in a shootout with Langley Royal Canadian Mounted Police (RCMP) and the Lower Mainland Emergency Response Team.

Shootings 

A Lower Mainland-wide emergency cellphone alert was issued at 6:20 a.m. PDT announcing that multiple shootings had taken place in Downtown Langley, and that one shooting was also reported in the adjacent Langley Township. The alert also mentioned that the police were looking for a dark-haired white man wearing brown Carhartt coveralls and a blue and green camouflage shirt with a red logo on the right sleeve.

According to British Columbia RCMP, the shooting spree began at midnight on July 25 in the parking lot of Cascades Casino on Fraser Highway, where an injured woman was found in critical condition. At 3:00 a.m. a man was killed at a supportive housing site at 200 Street and 64 Avenue. The shooter proceeded to the Langley bus loop at Logan Avenue and Glover Road, and fatally shot a second man at around 5:00 a.m. Around 5:45 a.m. the perpetrator drove to the Langley Bypass, near the Willowbrook Shopping Centre, in a white car. While there, he wounded another man by shooting him in the leg. Shortly before 7:20 a.m., the perpetrator died in a shootout with the police at the same location. He was subsequently identified as 28-year-old Jordan Daniel Goggin from Surrey, British Columbia. Three of the victims were homeless.

Another emergency alert was sent at 7:20 a.m. cautioning residents to avoid the downtown core of Langley as authorities investigated whether or not there were more shooters.

Victims 
The two deceased victims were Paul David Wynn, age 60, and Steven Furness, age 43. On July 26, 2022, an informal vigil was held for the victims, and was attended by 100 people. Another vigil for the deceased victims was held on August 3, 2022 at the Innes Corners Plaza on the northwest corner of 204 Street and Fraser Highway. 

The two wounded victims, a 26-year-old woman and man, were treated for their injuries in the hospital.

Perpetrator 
The perpetrator of the shootings was Jordan Daniel Goggin (1993/1994 – July 25, 2022), a 28-year-old resident of Surrey, British Columbia, a city west of Langley. He was known to the police, but not criminally. Goggin had no criminal record in British Columbia prior to the shooting, but was the defendant of a lawsuit in Cloverdale. The lawsuit, which was launched in November 2020, was filed by a woman who was allegedly injured in a Delta car crash caused by Goggin on September 15, 2018. The lawsuit was set to go to trial by February 2023.

Response 
In a CBC opinion piece on 31 July, former Manitoba minister for health Sharon Blady suggested the shootings were inspired by claims made by American podcaster Joe Rogan about shooting homeless people.

At a vigil for the victims on 3 August, a spokesperson for the homeless advocacy group Kimz Angels advocated for more safe housing for people experiencing homelessness. The mayor of Langley city, Val van den Broek, said “People shouldn’t be living on the streets like animals. It's so wrong.”

See also 
2022 Saanich shootout, British Columbia event that occurred a month earlier

References

External links 

 Joint statement by John Horgan (British Columbia Premier) and Mike Farnworth (British Columbia Minister for Public Safety) on the shootings

2022 murders in Canada
2022 in British Columbia
2022 mass shootings in Canada
Attacks on buildings and structures in 2022
Attacks on buildings and structures in Canada
Attacks on shopping malls
Murder in British Columbia
Deaths by firearm in British Columbia
Discrimination against the homeless
July 2022 crimes in North America
July 2022 events in Canada
Langley, British Columbia (city)
Langley, British Columbia (district municipality)
Spree shootings in Canada
Violence against men in North America
Violence against women in Canada